Adam Burton may refer to:

 Maxwell Atoms (Adam Maxwell Burton, born 1974), American animator, screenwriter, storyboard artist, and voice actor
 Adam Burton (baseball) (born 1972), Australian baseball player